Gentle Annie may refer to:

 "Gentle Annie" (song), an 1856 American song composed by Stephen Foster
 "Gentle Annie" (Tommy Makem song), a song by Tommy Makem
 Gentle Annie (film), a 1944 American film
 Gentle Annie, a 1942 novel by MacKinlay Kantor; basis for the film
 "Gentle Annie", a Celtic mythological figure with similarities to the Irish goddess Anu
 Cenchrus longispinus or Gentle Annie, a species of grass
 Gentle Annie Summit, an elevation near Tiniroto, New Zealand
 Gentle Annie Tramway, a narrow gauge railway near Gisborne, New Zealand

People
 Francis Joseph Bayldon (1872–1948), Australian master mariner and nautical instructor
 Anna Etheridge (1839–1913), Union nurse during the American Civil War
 Alfred Jefferis Turner (1861–1947), Australian pediatrician and entomologist